The Labour Party leadership of Jeremy Corbyn began when Jeremy Corbyn was elected as Leader of the UK Labour Party in September 2015, following the resignation of Ed Miliband after Labour's defeat at the 2015 general election. Disillusioned by a lack of a left-wing voice in the 2015 leadership contest, Corbyn stood on an anti-austerity platform. Of the candidates who stood, Corbyn received the fewest parliamentary nominations. Many who nominated him said they had done so not to support his candidacy, but to widen the debate by including a socialist voice. However, Corbyn soon became the frontrunner and was elected with a landslide of 59%.

Corbyn appointed John McDonnell as Shadow Chancellor and promoted several female backbenchers, forming a Shadow Cabinet that for the first time had more women than men. Under Corbyn's leadership, Labour shifted to the left from the centre-ground. In November 2015, he voted against British military involvement in the Syrian civil war. He also opposed the renewal of the Trident nuclear weapons system and apologised for the Blair ministry taking the UK into the Iraq War. In spite of his victory, Corbyn enjoyed little support from Labour MPs, although his support remained strong amongst Labour Party members. In 2016, Labour performed poorly at the local and regional elections, and following the European Union membership referendum, in which Britain voted to leave the EU, party opponents accused Corbyn of running a lukewarm campaign for Remain. Several resigned from the Shadow Cabinet and Corbyn lost a motion of no confidence by 197–40. Angela Eagle and Owen Smith launched a formal challenge, although Eagle later withdrew. Corbyn was re-elected with a marginally higher majority of 61%.

Although Labour suffered poor results at the local elections in May 2017, at the snap 2017 general election the party secured 40% of the vote with the biggest increase in Labour vote share for 72 years, and forced the Conservatives to form a minority government, with Labour remaining in opposition. In the 2018 local elections, Labour increased its share of the vote. In the 2019 local elections, Labour's seat total dropped by 84. In the 2019 European Parliament election, Labour came third behind the Brexit Party and the Liberal Democrats. In the 2019 general election, Labour's vote share dropped to 32%, winning the lowest number of seats since 1935. The result led to Corbyn's announcement that he would stand down as Labour leader. Some reasons for the defeat included concerns about Corbyn's leadership, the party's "ambiguous" position on Brexit, and concerns that the commitments in the left-wing manifesto were "undeliverable".

Leadership election

Following the Labour Party's defeat at the general election on 7 May 2015, Ed Miliband resigned as its party leader, triggering a leadership election. On 2 June, it was reported in media sources that Corbyn was considering standing as a candidate, having been disillusioned by the lack of a left-wing voice. The next day, Corbyn confirmed to his local newspaper, the Islington Tribune, that he would stand in the election on a "clear anti-austerity platform". He added: "This decision is in response to an overwhelming call by Labour Party members who want to see a broader range of candidates and a thorough debate about the future of the party. I am standing to give Labour Party members a voice in this debate". The other candidates were Shadow Home Secretary Yvette Cooper, Shadow Health Secretary Andy Burnham and Shadow Care Minister Liz Kendall. Corbyn had the lowest number of nominations from fellow MPs of any Labour Party Leader, and several who nominated him later claimed to have cleared him to run more to widen the political debate within the party than because of a desire or expectation that he would win. Nonetheless, he rapidly became the frontrunner among the candidates.

At the Second Reading of the Welfare Reform and Work Bill in July 2015, Corbyn joined 47 Labour MPs to oppose the Bill, describing it as "rotten and indefensible", whilst the other three leadership candidates abstained. In August 2015, he called on Iain Duncan Smith to resign as Secretary of State for Work and Pensions after it emerged that thousands of disabled people had died after being found fit to work by Work Capability Assessments (instituted in 2008) between 2011 and 2014.

Following a rule change under Miliband, members of the public who supported Labour's aims and values could join the party as "registered supporters" for £3 and be entitled to vote in the election. There was speculation the rule change would lead to Corbyn being elected by registered supporters without majority support from ordinary members. Corbyn was elected party leader in a landslide victory on 12 September 2015 with 59.5% of first-preference votes in the first round of voting. It has been calculated that Corbyn would have won in the first round with 51% of votes, even without "£3 registered supporters", having gained the support of 49.6% of full members and 57.6% of affiliated supporters. Corbyn's 40.5% majority was larger than that attained by Tony Blair in 1994. His margin of victory was said to be "the largest mandate ever won by a party leader", though no previous Labour leader had been elected with so little support from their own MPs.

Opinion polls of the general public during the first few months of Corbyn's leadership were the lowest personal approval ratings of any Labour leader in the early stages of their leadership. His approval amongst party members, however, was initially strong reaching a net approval of +45 in May 2016, though this fell back sharply to just +3 by the end of the next month following criticism of Corbyn's handling of the EU referendum and a string of Shadow Cabinet resignations.

Leader of the Opposition

After being elected leader on 12 September 2015, Corbyn became Leader of the Official Opposition. On 14 September 2015, his appointment to the Privy Council was announced. Two days later Corbyn engaged in his first Prime Minister's Questions session as leader and broke with the traditional format by asking the Prime Minister six questions he had received from members of the public, the result of his invitation to Labour Party members to send suggestions, for which he received around 40,000 emails. Corbyn stressed his desire to reduce the "theatrical" nature of the House of Commons, and his debut was described in a The Guardian editorial as "a good start" and a "long overdue" change to the tone of PMQs. He delivered his first Labour Annual Conference address as leader on 29 September 2015. As Leader of the Opposition he was made a member of the Privy Council on 11 November 2015.

In late October 2015, Corbyn appointed The Guardian journalist Seumas Milne as the Labour Party's Executive Director of Strategy and Communications. The former cabinet minister in the Blair and Brown governments, Lord Mandelson, in a BBC interview said Corbyn had shown a lack of professionalism in choosing Milne, "whom I happen to know and like as it happens. But he's completely unsuited to such a job, he has little connection with mainstream politics or mainstream media in this country". Peter Wilby wrote in the New Statesman in April 2016 that Milne's selection became "another target in the press assault on Corbyn and his supporters, mounted mostly, but not entirely, by right-wing papers".

First shadow cabinet and other appointments

On 13 September 2015, Corbyn unveiled his Shadow Cabinet. He appointed his leadership campaign manager and long-standing political ally John McDonnell as Shadow Chancellor, leadership opponent Andy Burnham as Shadow Home Secretary, and Angela Eagle as Shadow First Secretary of State to deputise for him in the House of Commons. Corbyn promoted a number of female backbench MPs to Shadow Cabinet roles, including Diane Abbott, Heidi Alexander and Lisa Nandy, making his the first Shadow Cabinet with more women than men.

Early in Corbyn's leadership of the Labour Party, an Economic Advisory Committee was formed, initially consisting of the Nobel Prize-winning economist Joseph Stiglitz, Professor of Economics and former Bank of England Monetary Policy Committee member David Blanchflower and Thomas Piketty, the author of Capital in the Twenty-First Century, among others, to help shape Labour's economic policies. Blanchflower resigned in June 2016, saying “Britain is in the deepest political and economic crisis in my lifetime and Corbyn is fighting for his own skin — time to put the country first,” and Piketty also resigned in June 2016 because of other commitments. Out of the remaining six members of the committee, five published a statement saying they were "unhappy" with Corbyn's role in the EU campaign.

Leadership of the Labour Party (effect and treatment)

Growth in the Labour Party

During and after Corbyn's leadership election, there was a large increase in the number of Labour Party members; from 201,293 on 6 May 2015 (the day before the 2015 general election) to 388,407 on 10 January 2016. Local Labour constituency offices have attributed this rise mainly to the "Corbyn effect". Reflecting an increased interest among the young, university cities and towns recorded some of the biggest rises. Following Corbyn's election as Leader of the Labour Party, Bath's Labour Party membership increased from 300 to 1,322 and Colchester's from 200–250 to 1,000. Momentum, a grassroots movement supportive of Corbyn and the Labour Party, has (as of 2019) about 40,000 members. Following the EU membership referendum on 23 June 2016, and the many resignations of shadow ministers which followed, 100,000 new members joined the Labour Party, raising Labour's total membership to 503,143.

Media coverage of Corbyn as leader of the Labour Party
In July 2016, a study and analysis by academics from the London School of Economics of months of eight national newspaper articles about Corbyn in the first months of his leadership of Labour showed that 75% of them either distorted or failed to represent his actual views on subjects. The academic report argues that the British media has systematically attacked and delegitimised Corbyn as a political leader ever since he rose to national prominence in the summer of 2015. The authors argued that Corbyn was represented with scorn and ridicule in both the broadsheet and tabloid press "through a process of vilification that went well beyond the normal limits of fair debate and disagreement in a democracy."

A report by Birkbeck, University of London and the Media Reform Coalition analysed TV and online news during the 10 days after the wave of resignations from Corbyn's shadow cabinet following the Brexit vote in late June 2016, found "a marked and persistent imbalance in favour of sources critical of Jeremy Corbyn". Roy Greenslade acknowledged the media had been consistently hostile to Corbyn, but described the weight of criticism against Corbyn as "unsurprising" given the circumstances, arguing "with something like 80% of his parliamentary party against him, would democracy benefit from a failure to reflect that reality?"

In May 2017, according to study and analysis from an edition of Loughborough University's Centre for Research in Communication and Culture weekly reports into national news reporting of the election, a "considerable majority" of the reports on Labour are critical of Labour, its leader and its manifesto, whereas newspapers are being far more balanced in their coverage of the Conservatives with positive and negative reporting balancing each other out. The attacks coming from the most popular national newspapers, with The Sun and the Daily Express particularly focusing their negative coverage on Labour. The Daily Mail and The Times have also been hostile to Labour but have balanced that out with positive reporting on the Conservatives. The Daily Mail and Daily Express praised Theresa May for election pledges that were condemned when proposed by Labour in previous elections. In the same month, Noam Chomsky said that Corbyn would be doing better in opinion polls if it was not for the "bitter" hostility of the mainstream media, he said, "If he had a fair treatment from the media – that would make a big difference."

Military intervention in Syria
After members of Islamic State carried out terrorist attacks in Paris in November 2015, Corbyn suggested that the only way to deal with the threat posed by the jihadist group would be to reach a political settlement aimed at resolving the Syrian civil war. Prime Minister David Cameron sought to build political consensus for UK military intervention against IS targets in Syria in the days after the attacks. Speaking at a regional party conference in Bristol on 21 November, Corbyn warned against "external intervention" in Syria but told delegates that Labour would "consider the proposals the Government brings forward".

Cameron set out his case for military intervention to Parliament on 26 November, telling MPs that it was the only way to guarantee Britain's safety and would be part of a "comprehensive" strategy to defeat ISIS. Corbyn's Shadow Cabinet met immediately after the Prime Minister's statement in which Corbyn said he would continue with efforts "to reach a common view" on Syria, while Shadow Foreign Secretary Hilary Benn suggested the case for air strikes was "compelling". Later that evening Corbyn sent a letter to Labour MPs saying that he could not support military action against Islamic State: "The issue [is] whether what the Prime Minister is proposing strengthens, or undermines, our national security. ... I do not believe the current proposal for air strikes in Syria will protect our security and therefore cannot support it." Amid widespread reports of division in the Parliamentary Labour Party and criticism of his leadership, Corbyn, on  The Andrew Marr Show, said he was "not going anywhere" and was "enjoying every minute" of his leadership, insisting that the final decision on whether the Labour Party would oppose air strikes rested with him. On 30 November, Corbyn agreed that Labour MPs would be given a free vote on air strikes when the issue was voted on two days later. A total of 66 Labour MPs voted for the Syrian air strikes, including Hilary Benn and Deputy Labour Leader Tom Watson, while Corbyn and the majority of Labour MPs voted against.

January 2016 Shadow Cabinet reshuffle

There was widespread speculation following the vote that Corbyn would reshuffle his Shadow Cabinet to remove Hilary Benn, but Corbyn's January reshuffle retained Benn in the same position. The reshuffle prompted the resignations of three junior shadow ministers who were unhappy that Corbyn had demoted MPs who disagreed with his position on Syria and Trident.

On 6 January 2016, Corbyn replaced Shadow Culture Secretary Michael Dugher with Shadow Defence Secretary Maria Eagle (who was in turn replaced by Shadow Employment Minister Emily Thornberry). Thornberry, unlike Maria Eagle, is an opponent of nuclear weapons and British involvement in Syria. Eagle was in turn moved to Shadow Culture Secretary to replace Michael Dugher. Corbyn also replaced Shadow Europe Minister (not attending Shadow Cabinet) Pat McFadden with Pat Glass. The reshuffle prompted three junior shadow ministers to resign in solidarity with McFadden: Shadow Rail Minister Jonathan Reynolds, Shadow Defence Minister Kevan Jones and Shadow Foreign Minister Stephen Doughty. On 7 January, Reynolds was replaced by Andy McDonald, Doughty by Fabian Hamilton, Jones by Kate Hollern and Thornberry by Angela Rayner; as well as appointing Jenny Chapman to the education team and Jo Stevens to the justice team.

On 11 January 2016, Shadow Attorney General Catherine McKinnell resigned, citing party infighting, family reasons and her wish to speak in Parliament beyond her legal portfolio. She was replaced by Karl Turner.

May 2016 local elections
A series of elections for local councils and devolved legislatures took place on 5 May 2016. Voting was held for the Scottish Parliament, the National Assembly for Wales, 124 English local councils and 4 elected mayorships, including the Mayor of London. There were also Westminster by-elections in two Labour safe seats, which Labour retained: Ogmore and Sheffield Brightside and Hillsborough.

Labour had a net loss of 18 local council seats and controlled as many councils as before (gaining control of Bristol but losing Dudley). The BBC's Projected National Vote Share was 31% for Labour, 30% for the Conservatives, 15% for the Liberal Democrats and 12% for UKIP. Labour candidate Sadiq Khan won the London mayorship from the Conservatives. Labour's misfortunes in Scotland continued, where they fell into third place behind the Conservatives. They retained government in Wales despite some small losses.

Summer 2016 leadership challenge

Brexit referendum

Despite earlier comments during the leadership campaign that there might be circumstances in which he would favour withdrawal, in September 2015, Corbyn said that Labour will campaign for Britain to stay in the EU regardless of the result of Cameron's negotiations, and instead "pledge to reverse any changes" if Cameron reduces the rights of workers or citizens. He also believed that Britain should play a crucial role in Europe by making demands about working arrangements across the continent, the levels of corporation taxation and in forming an agreement on environmental regulation.

In June 2016, in the run-up to the EU referendum, Corbyn said that there was an "overwhelming case" for staying in the EU. In a speech in London, Corbyn said: "We, the Labour Party, are overwhelmingly for staying in, because we believe the European Union has brought investment, jobs and protection for workers, consumers and the environment." Corbyn also criticised media coverage and warnings from both sides, saying that the debate had been dominated too much by "myth-making and prophecies of doom". However, on 11 June he admitted his passion for staying in the EU was only "seven, or seven and a half" out of 10.

On 24 June, the morning after the vote, Corbyn implied that the withdrawal process should start immediately saying that "Article 50 has to be invoked now so that we negotiate an exit from the European Union", A month later, he told Evan Davis of Newsnight: "I may not have put that as well as I should have done," that the treaty will be invoked at some stage but there was no rush.

Following the public voting to leave the EU, Corbyn was accused of “lukewarm” campaigning for Britain to stay in the European Union and showing a "lack of leadership" on the issue by several party figures Alan Johnson, who headed up the Labour In for Britain campaign said "at times" it felt as if Corbyn's office was "working against the rest of the party and had conflicting objectives". Corbyn's decision to go on holiday during the campaign was criticised,

In September 2016, Corbyn's spokesman said Corbyn wanted access to the single market, but there were "aspects" of EU membership related to privatisation "which Jeremy campaigned against in the referendum campaign."

Shadow Cabinet resignations

Three days after the EU referendum, Hilary Benn was sacked after it was disclosed that he had been organizing a mass resignation of shadow cabinet members to force Corbyn to stand down. Heidi Alexander resigned from the Shadow Cabinet hours later, followed by Gloria de Piero, Ian Murray, Lilian Greenwood, Lucy Powell, Kerry McCarthy, Seema Malhotra, Vernon Coaker, Charlie Falconer, and Chris Bryant. Other Shadow Cabinet Ministers, including John McDonnell, Andy Burnham, Diane Abbott, Jon Trickett, Angela Smith, Emily Thornberry and Lord Bassam of Brighton either supported Corbyn's leadership directly or said that it was an inappropriate time for a rebellion. Emily Thornberry, shadow defence secretary, said: "The country is calling out for the Labour party to step up ... we must do that in a unified way. Now is not the time for internecine conflict." Andy Burnham, shadow home secretary, also said it was not the time for a "civil war" in the party. Corbyn said he regretted the resignations from the shadow cabinet, but he said he would not "betray the trust of those who voted for me". "Those who want to change Labour’s leadership will have to stand in a democratic election, in which I will be a candidate."

By mid-afternoon on 27 June 2016, 23 of the 31 shadow cabinet members had resigned their roles as did seven parliamentary private secretaries. Earlier Corbyn announced changes to his shadow cabinet, moving Emily Thornberry (to Shadow Foreign Secretary), Diane Abbott (to Shadow Health Secretary), and appointing the following to his shadow cabinet: Pat Glass, Andy McDonald, Clive Lewis, Rebecca Long-Bailey, Kate Osamor, Rachael Maskell, Cat Smith and Dave Anderson. According to a source quoted by the BBC, the party's Deputy Leader Tom Watson told Corbyn that "it looks like we are moving towards a leadership election". Corbyn reiterated that he would run again in that event. During the day Corbyn filled some of the resulting shadow cabinet vacancies, however just two days later one of the newly appointed members, Pat Glass, resigned, saying that "the situation is untenable".

Vote of no confidence
A motion of no confidence in Corbyn as Labour leader was tabled by the MPs Margaret Hodge and Ann Coffey in a letter to the chairman of the Parliamentary Labour Party on 24 June 2016. Hodge said "This has been a tumultuous referendum which has been a test of leadership ... Jeremy has failed that test". John McDonnell and union leaders including Len McCluskey condemned the motion, saying regards the referendum campaign that "Corbyn was honest and straightforward about a complex question" and that the 'Labour mutineers' were "plunging their party into an unwanted crisis are betraying not only the party itself but also our national interest at one of the most critical moments."

On 28 June he lost the vote of confidence by Labour Party MPs by 172–40. He responded with a statement that the motion had no "constitutional legitimacy" and that he intended to continue as the elected leader. The vote does not require the party to call a leadership election but, according to Anushka Asthana of The Guardian, "the result is likely to lead to a direct challenge to Corbyn as some politicians scramble to collect enough nominations to trigger a formal challenge to his leadership." By 29 June, Corbyn had been encouraged to resign by Tom Watson and senior Labour politicians including his predecessor, Ed Miliband. Several union leaders (from GMB, UCATT, the CWU, the TSSA, ASLEF, the FBU, the BFWAU and the NUM) issued a joint statement saying that Corbyn was "the democratically-elected leader of Labour and his position should not be challenged except through the proper democratic procedures provided for in the party's constitution" and that a leadership election would be an "unnecessary distraction". Diane Abbott, shadow health secretary, said that cabinet resignations and secret ballot had no status under the party rule book. “MPs don't choose the leader of the Labour party, the party does". A YouGov poll of Labour party members carried out between the 27 and 30 June found that about 50% expected to back Corbyn if a leadership ballot was called. London Mayor Sadiq Khan, who did not take a side in the dispute, said "When Labour splits, when we're divided, we lose elections".

Response to the Chilcot report
The Chilcot report of the Iraq Inquiry was issued on 6 July 2016 criticising the former Labour PM Tony Blair for joining the United States in the war against Iraq. Subsequently, Corbyn – who had voted against military action against Iraq – gave a speech in Westminster commenting: "I now apologise sincerely on behalf of my party for the disastrous decision to go to war in Iraq in March 2003" which he called an "act of military aggression launched on a false pretext" something that has "long been regarded as illegal by the overwhelming weight of international opinion". Corbyn specifically apologised to "the people of Iraq"; to the families of British soldiers who died in Iraq or returned injured; and to "the millions of British citizens who feel our democracy was traduced and undermined by the way in which the decision to go to war was taken on."

Trident and the renewal vote
The issue of renewing the Trident system was expected to exacerbate differences in the party, with official policy remaining in favour of renewal despite Corbyn being a longstanding supporter of unilateral nuclear disarmament.
Earlier in 2016, Corbyn had suggested a compromise of retaining submarines but without nuclear weapons. On 18 June 2016, he agreed to a free vote, with 140 Labour MPs voted with the government in favour of the new submarines, in line with party policy, and 47 joining Corbyn to vote against, while 43 abstained. After the vote, Corbyn reiterated his position that the UK should "move rapidly towards [nuclear] disarmament". The BBC's Political Editor, Laura Kuenssberg, reported that "a succession of the party's MPs accused Mr Corbyn of opposing official party policy by arguing against it at this stage with one, Jamie Reed, calling his stance 'juvenile and narcissistic'".

2016 leadership election

The division between Corbyn and the Labour parliamentary party continued. On 4 July 2016 Angela Eagle, who had recently resigned from his shadow cabinet, repeated that she was ready to mount the primary challenge to his leadership. In an interview with Sky News, she said, "I have the support to run and resolve this impasse and I will do so if Jeremy doesn't take action soon". On the same day, Corbyn defended his leadership based on his mandate from the first leadership election, writing in the Sunday Mirror: “I am ready to reach out to Labour MPs who didn’t accept my election and oppose my leadership – and work with the whole party to provide the alternative the country needs.” Eagle formally launched her leadership campaign on 11 July 2016.
After news reports that Eagle's office had been vandalised on 11 July 2016, and of threats and abuse to other MPs, including death threats to himself, Corbyn said: "It is extremely concerning that Angela Eagle has been the victim of a threatening act" and called for "respect and dignity, even where there is disagreement."

Late on 12 July 2016, following a dispute as to whether the elected leader would need nominations in an election as a "challenger" to their own leadership, the Labour Party National Executive Committee (NEC) resolved that Corbyn, as the incumbent leader, had an automatic right to be on the ballot. At that same meeting, Labour's NEC decided that members needed to have signed up on or before 12 January 2016 to be eligible to vote (nearly 130,000 people had become Labour Party members alone since the EU referendum alone, would not be allowed to vote). The NEC did however decide that "registered supporters" would be entitled to vote, for its next leader of the Labour Party, if they paid a one off fee of £25. 184,541 people subsequently paid the one-off fee to become "registered supporters" of the party during the two-day window in July. Owen Smith said "in last 48 hours more people have registered as Labour supporters than the entire membership of the Tory party". Along with the 388,000 people who were full members six months ago, plus the 147,134 (July 2015 figure) affiliated supporters (mostly from affiliated trade unions and socialist societies), this means that over 700,000 will have a vote in the leadership election. The decision to retain Corbyn on the ballot was contested unsuccessfully in a High Court action brought by Labour donor Michael Foster.

On 13 July, Owen Smith entered the Labour Party leadership race. Subsequently, on 19 July, Eagle withdrew and offered her endorsement to Smith.

The results of an Ipsos MORI survey polling the British public as a whole, and released on 14 July, indicated that 66% of those surveyed believed that the Labour party needed a new leader before the then-scheduled 2020 election. In addition, only 23 percent believed that Corbyn would make a good Prime Minister, while Theresa May had an approval rating of 55 percent. An Opinium/Observer poll on 23 July found that among those who say they back Labour, 54% supported Corbyn against just 22% who would prefer Smith. Some 20% said they were undecided and 4% said they did not intend to vote. When voters were asked who they thought would be the best prime minister – Corbyn or May – among Labour supporters, 48% said Corbyn and 22% May, whilst among all UK voters, 52% chose May and just 16% were for Corbyn.

According to Andrew Rawnsley, The Observers political columnist: "The truth is that Labour MPs would not have acted this summer but for the Brexit vote. It was the shock of that, combined with collective horror about Mr Corbyn’s response to it, which finally pushed them into despairing action". On 24 July 2016, he wrote that "much of that selectorate is wildly unrepresentative of the voters that Labour must persuade if the party is to survive as a plausible opposition, never mind become a viable competitor for power".

More than 40 female Labour MPs, in an open letter during the campaign in July 2016, called on Corbyn to deal with issues relating to online abuse, and criticised him for his allegedly unsatisfactory responses and inaction. Speaking at the launch of policies intending to democratise the internet in late August, Corbyn admitted that such abuse is "appalling". He continued: "I have set up a code of conduct on this. The Labour party has a code of conduct on this, and it does have to be dealt with".

On 16 August 2016, Corbyn released a video of himself sitting on the floor of a Virgin Trains East Coast train while travelling to a leadership hustings in Gateshead. Corbyn said the train was "ram-packed" and used this to support his policy to reverse the 1990s privatisation of the railways of Great Britain. A dispute, nicknamed Traingate in the media, developed a week later, when Virgin released selected CCTV images appearing to show that Corbyn had walked past some available seats on the train before recording his video. Corbyn subsequently said that there had not been room for all his team to sit together until later on in the journey, when other passengers were upgraded by train staff.

The psephologist John Curtice wrote just before Corbyn's second leadership win: "There is evidently a section of the British public, to be found particularly among younger voters, for whom the Labour leader does have an appeal; it just does not look like a section that is big enough, on its own at least, to enable Labour to win a general election". Meanwhile, a poll for The Independent by BMG Research, suggested that working class voters were more likely to consider Corbyn "incompetent" than those from the middle class, and a higher proportion thought he was "out of touch" also. Martin Kettle of The Guardian wrote that "many Labour MPs, even some who face defeat, want an early election" to prove decisively that Corbyn's Labour is unelectable as a government. "If there is hope for Labour it lies with the voters. Only they can change the party."

Second leadership win
Corbyn was re-elected as Labour leader on 24 September, with 313,209 votes (61.8%) compared to 193,229 (38.2%) for Smith – a slightly increased share of the vote compared to his election in 2015, when he won 59%. On a turnout of 77.6%, Corbyn won the support of 59% of party members, 70% of registered supporters and 60% of affiliated supporters. In his acceptance speech, Corbyn called on the "Labour family" to end their divisions and to "wipe that slate clean from today and get on with the work we’ve got to do as a party". He continued: "Together, arguing for the real change this country needs, I have no doubt this party can win the next election whenever the Prime Minister decides to call it and form the next government."

The BBC's Laura Kuenssberg wrote that his new mandate demonstrates his critics "will be shown to have failed badly in their attempt to oust him." Andrew Grice, writing for The Independent, said "it is going to be very difficult to put the pieces back together again and create a stable opposition. Too much blood has already been spilled".

October 2016 – May 2017

President Obama comments
In December 2016, US president Barack Obama said that the British Labour party had "disintegrated" following their 2015 election defeat and that the party is still in a "very frail state". He also said that Bernie Sanders was a centrist compared to Corbyn. Corbyn's spokesperson hit back, saying that “What Jeremy Corbyn stands for is what most people want: to take on the tax cheats, create a fairer economy, fund a fully public NHS, build more homes, and stop backing illegal wars. For the establishment, those ideas are dangerous. For most people in Britain, they’re common sense and grounded in reality.”

Maximum wage cap
In January 2016, Corbyn initially called for a maximum wage cap, saying that he wanted “some kind of high earnings cap”. He did not specify an exact figure, but said it would be "somewhat higher" than his £138,000 salary. Later on the same day, Corbyn pulled back from the idea of a legal cap, instead suggesting that any business which was awarded government contracts would only be able to pay their highest-paid staff twenty times as much as their lowest-paid staff. He also suggested corporation tax cuts for businesses which showed restraint on executive pay.

Article 50
In January 2017, Corbyn announced that Labour would impose a three-line whip to force Labour MPs in favour of triggering Article 50. In response, two Labour whips said they would vote against the bill. Tulip Siddiq, the shadow minister for early years, and Jo Stevens, the Shadow Welsh Secretary resigned in protest. On 1 February, 47 Labour MPs defied the whip on the second reading of the bill.

May 2017 local elections

The Conservative Party enjoyed the best local election performance in a decade, making significant gains at the expense of the Labour Party, this despite the party having been in government for nearly seven years.

2017 general election

Corbyn said he welcomed Prime Minister Theresa May's proposal to seek an early general election in 2017. He said his party should support the government's move in the parliamentary vote.

Earlier in the year, Corbyn had become the first opposition party leader since Michael Foot in 1982 to lose a by-election to an incumbent government, and at the time May called the snap election, Labour trailed the Conservative Party by up to 25 points in some opinion polls. A large Conservative majority was widely predicted. However, following the short campaign, Labour surprised many pundits by increasing their number and share of votes and seats but lost the election, with the Conservatives remaining the largest party but losing their Parliamentary majority. Labour's vote share increase was its largest since 1945. Corbyn said the result was a public call for the end of "austerity politics" and suggested May should step down as Prime Minister. Corbyn claimed to have received the largest vote for a winning candidate in the history of his borough, Islington.

Prior to the election, Corbyn received endorsements from numerous celebrities. According to poll data released by YouGov, 61.5% of under-40s voted for Labour, compared to just 23% who voted Conservative. After the general election result, senior Labour MPs and former advisers who have previously criticised Corbyn expressed notably different attitudes towards him. Many from within the party praised Corbyn after Theresa May was prevented from obtaining the majority she sought in the election. Labour Party membership increased by 35,000 within four days of the general election.

2017–2019 hung parliament

Brexit
In November 2017, Labour whipped Labour MPs to vote against an amendment by Labour MP Ian Murray that would have forced the government to keep the UK in the customs union and single market.

Labour consistently opposed Theresa May's withdrawal agreement and, in March 2019, the party whipped MPs to vote against leaving the EU  as soon as possible.

During the rounds of indicative votes held in Parliament in April 2019, Labour whipped Labour MPs to vote in favour of the customs union (motion C), Common Market 2.0 (motion D) and a confirmatory public vote (motion E).

2018 local elections

In the May 2018 local elections, Labour saw a net gain of council seats; that cycle included a number of London and metropolitan boroughs, which have traditionally been the party's strongholds.

House of Lords resignations
In 2017 Norman Warner, Baron Warner & Anthony Grabiner, Baron Grabiner both resigned from the party due to the direction it was heading under Corbyn, and were later followed by Parry Mitchell, Baron Mitchell.
 	
In 2019, David Triesman, Baron Triesman, Leslie Turnberg, Baron Turnberg & Ara Darzi, Baron Darzi of Denham resigned from the party over alleged antisemitism within the party.

Labour MPs resign from the party
In February 2019, seven MPs: Luciana Berger, Ann Coffey, Mike Gapes, Chris Leslie, Gavin Shuker, Angela Smith & Chuka Umunna, left the Labour Party to form The Independent Group (later Change UK), citing their dissatisfaction with Labour's leftward political direction and its approach to Brexit and to allegations of antisemitism in the party. They were later joined by Joan Ryan. Four more MPs, Frank Field, Louise Ellman, John Mann and Ian Austin resigned from Labour to sit as independents at various times due to alleged anti-semitism and their failure to retain the support of their local parties. Four of the MPs had recently lost votes of no-confidence brought by their constituency parties, while two such motions against Berger had recently been withdrawn.

2019 local elections
In the 2019 local elections, Labour won 2,023 seats, down by 84 from the previous set of elections.

2019 European elections

In the May 2019 EU elections – which were originally not scheduled to take place – Labour came third behind the Brexit Party and the Liberal Democrats, and were wiped out in Scotland. It was the party's worst result at a national election since 1910, with just 13.6% of the vote. This performance was attributed to Labour's attempts to "ride two horses", by appealing to both Leave and Remain voters; the Brexit Party and Liberal Democrats were clearly in favour of Leave and Remain respectively. Scottish Labour MPs Ian Murray and Martin Whitfield said that the "blame for the worst result in Scottish Labour's history lies squarely with our party's leadership".

2019 general election and departure

The 2019 general election saw major losses for Labour, and just one seat gained. In the aftermath of these disappointing results for the party, Corbyn announced that he would not lead Labour into the next general election, paving the way for the election of a new leader in early 2020.  Early on in the leadership contest, Corbyn stated he would not endorse any candidate to be his successor. Keir Starmer won the resulting leadership election and was confirmed as the new Labour Party leader on 4 April 2020.

Reception
According to The Economist, "Mr Corbyn has been the party's most disastrous leader ever—not just useless like George Lansbury and Michael Foot, who led the party to electoral disaster in 1935 and 1983 respectively, but positively malign."

According to Zarah Sultana, MP for Coventry South, he "inspired hope of a better future".

Handling of antisemitism complaints

Corbyn has been accused of taking insufficient action regarding complaints of anti-Semitism in Labour. In April 2019, the Jewish Labour Movement passed a motion of no-confidence in his leadership. Commencing in April 2016, Labour has responded to such complaints by conducting an inquiry, making antisemitism a disciplinary offence, increasing the capacity of its disciplinary procedures, warning and expelling a number of members, arranging for university level antisemitism training and producing educational material on antisemitism. Corbyn has repeatedly condemned antisemitism. Corbyn himself has been criticised for his past actions, with accusations that he himself is antisemitic.

References

 
2015 establishments in the United Kingdom
2020 disestablishments in the United Kingdom
2010s in the United Kingdom
History of the Labour Party (UK)
Tenures in political office by individual